Waldo Maguire (31 May 1920 – 23 November 2005) was a British broadcaster for the BBC. He had a long career with the BBC, culminating in his appointment in 1966 as the Controller of BBC Northern Ireland. He served in this position until 1972.

Born in Ulster as Benjamin Waldo Maguire, he attended Portadown College and Trinity College, Dublin, where he studied philosophy and mathematics. After graduating in 1942 from Trinity he was recruited to work at Bletchley Park as a codebreaker. There he met the woman who would become his wife, Lilian Martin. They were married until her death in 1998 and had four sons.

He was awarded the OBE in 1973 and retired from the BBC the following year. He suffered two strokes, the first in 1972, and the second in 1999.

Quote
 I’m a Christian ... and therefore I find it very difficult to go to church in Northern Ireland.

External links
 Obituary in The Times Online
 Obituary in The New Zealand Herald
 BBC Northern Ireland during The Troubles

1920 births
2005 deaths
BBC people
Alumni of Trinity College Dublin
British broadcasters
British cryptographers
Officers of the Order of the British Empire
People educated at Portadown College